To Reach a Dream is an album by guitarist Jimmy Ponder that was released by Muse in 1991.

Track listing 
All compositions by Jimmy Ponder except where noted
 "To Reach a Dream" – 6:27
 "You Are Too Beautiful" (Richard Rodgers, Lorenz Hart) – 6:02
 "Ruby" (Heinz Roemheld, Mitchell Parish) – 7:02
 "Bumpin' On Sunset" – 9:27
 "Oleo" (Sonny Rollins) – 2:59
 "At Last" (Harry Warren, Mack Gordon) – 6:08
 "This Bitter Earth" (Clyde Otis) – 9:04
 "Don't Be Flat Blues" – 4:42
Recorded at Van Gelder Studio, Englewood Cliffs, NJ on July 26, 1988 (tracks 2-4, 6 & 8) and at Fox Recording Studio, Rutherford, NJ on June 5, 1989 (tracks 1, 5 & 7)

Personnel 
Jimmy Ponder – guitar, vocals
Lonnie Smith – organ 
Geary Moore – rhythm guitar (tracks 2, 4 & 6)
Greg Bandy – drums
Lawrence Killian - percussion

References 

Jimmy Ponder albums
1991 albums
Muse Records albums
Albums recorded at Van Gelder Studio